Brian Levine (born November 22, 1963), known professionally as Brian Robbins, is an American film executive, actor, and filmmaker who is the current President and Chief Executive Officer of Paramount Pictures and Nickelodeon. He also serves as Chief Content Officer, Kids & Family, Paramount+.

In September 2021, it was announced that he would replace Jim Gianopulos as head of Paramount.

Early life
Robbins was born Brian Levine in Brooklyn, New York City on November 22, 1963. When Robbins was 16, his family moved to Los Angeles. He graduated from Grant High School in 1982.

Career
Following his father, prolific character actor Floyd Levine, into acting, Robbins made his television acting debut on an episode of Trapper John, M.D. He guest starred on a number of television series and had a recurring role on General Hospital.  As an actor, he is perhaps best known for his role as Eric Mardian on the ABC sitcom Head of the Class. He also hosted the children's version of the TV game show Pictionary in 1989.

In the 1990s, he started producing All That and its spin-offs on Nickelodeon. He has produced several sports films including Coach Carter and Hardball (2001). He produced Smallville and also One Tree Hill. He has often collaborated with producer Michael Tollin.

Robbins is the founder of AwesomenessTV, a YouTube channel aimed at teenagers, which has spun off into a TV series, of which Robbins is the executive producer. DreamWorks Animation acquired the company in 2013. On February 22, 2017, following NBCUniversal/Comcast's acquisition of DreamWorks Animation, Brian Robbins stepped down as AwesomenessTV's CEO, thus ending his five-year run with the company.

On June 7, 2017, Robbins became the president of Paramount Players, a newly formed division of Paramount Pictures. Robbins will work with Viacom's brands Nickelodeon, MTV, Comedy Central and BET to generate projects while also focusing on "contemporary properties".

On October 1, 2018, Robbins left his position as the president of Paramount Players after Viacom tapped him to be the president of Nickelodeon, ending his 16-month run at the studio. Despite leaving the studio, he remained involved with Paramount Players' division Nickelodeon Movies. He became head of Paramount Pictures in September 2021, replacing veteran studio head Jim Gianopulos.

Personal life
Robbins is Jewish. He was married to publicist Laura Cathcart, with whom he has two sons, Miles and Justin; they divorced in 2013. The following year, Robbins married Tracy James. They have a daughter named Stella.

Filmography

Film

Producer only
 Summer Catch (2001)
 Big Fat Liar (2002) (Also story writer)
 Radio (2003)
 Coach Carter (2005)
 Wild Hogs (2007)
 The To Do List (2013)
 Before I Fall (2017)
 Bigger Fatter Liar (2017) (executive producer)

Television

Executive producer only
 The Amanda Show (2000–2001)
 Smallville (2001–2011)
 The Nick Cannon Show (2002)
 What I Like About You (2002–2006)
 One Tree Hill (2003–2012)
 Crumbs (2006)
 Sonny with a Chance (2009–2011)
 Fred: The Movie (2010)
 So Random! (2011–2012)
 AwesomenessTV (2013–2015)

Special thanks 

 Are You Smarter Than a 5th Grader? (2019)
 The Loud House (2019–present)
 SpongeBob SquarePants (2019–present)
 Middle School Moguls (2019)
 Blaze and the Monster Machines (2019–present)
 Are You Afraid of the Dark? (2019)
 The Casagrandes (2019–2022)
 Blue's Clues & You! (2019–present)
 It's Pony (2020–present)
 Glitch Techs (2020)
 Santiago of the Seas (2020–present)
 Baby Shark's Big Show! (2020–present)
 Kamp Koral: SpongeBob's Under Years (2021–present)
 Rugrats (2021–present)
 The Patrick Star Show (2021–present)
 Middlemost Post (2021–present)

Acting credits

Awards and nominations

References

External links
 
 

1963 births
Living people
Male actors from New York City
Film producers from New York (state)
American game show hosts
American male television actors
American television directors
Jewish American male actors
Television producers from New York City
Film directors from New York City
People from Brooklyn
Directors Guild of America Award winners
Grant High School (Los Angeles) alumni
Paramount Global people
Nickelodeon executives
Paramount Pictures executives
21st-century American Jews
Presidents of Paramount Pictures
Jewish American film directors
Jewish American film producers